FCOT may refer to:

Bétou Airport
Farnborough College of Technology